The 1995–96 Temple Owls men's basketball team represented Temple University as a member of the Atlantic 10 Conference during the 1995–96 NCAA Division I men's basketball season. The team was led by head coach John Chaney and played their home games at McGonigle Hall. The Owls played a rugged non-conference schedule that included matchups with four AP Top 5 teams in their first eight games. The team finished second in the A-10 regular season standings and received an at-large bid to the NCAA tournament as No. 7 seed in the Southeast region. Temple beat  in the opening round before losing to No. 2 seed Cincinnati, 78–65, in the round of 32. Temple finished with a record of 20–13 (12–4 A-10).

Roster

Schedule and results 

|-
!colspan=9 style=| Regular Season

|-
!colspan=9 style=| Atlantic 10 Tournament

|-
!colspan=9 style=| NCAA Tournament

Rankings

References 

Temple Owls men's basketball seasons
Temple
Temple
Temple
Temple